Simon Lewis may refer to:
Simon Lewis (writer) (born 1971), British novelist and screenwriter
Simon Lewis (The Mortal Instruments), a character in The Mortal Instruments series of novels
Simon Lewis (public relations officer) (born 1959), director of communications for PM Gordon Brown
Simon Lewis (Australian public servant)
Simon Lewis (lifeguard) (born 1984), Australian volunteer lifesaver

See also
Simon Lowys, Member of Parliament for Liskeard